I Surrender may refer to:

Songs
 "I Surrender" (Celine Dion song), 2002
 "I Surrender" (Clea song), 2006
 "I Surrender (To the Spirit of the Night)", a 1987 song by Samantha Fox
 "I Surrender" (David Sylvian song), 1999
 "I Surrender" (Michelle Wright song), 2000
"I Surrender" (Rainbow song)", 1981
 "I Surrender", by A Day to Remember from the album Common Courtesy
 "I Surrender", a 2016 song by All Sons & Daughters from the album Poets & Saints
 "I Surrender", by Michael Bolton from the album Only a Woman Like You
 "I Surrender", by Darrell Evans from the album You Are I AM
 "I Surrender", a 2012 song by Hillsong Live from the album Cornerstone

See also
 Surrender (disambiguation)
 I Surrender Dear (disambiguation)